ZNS-3 (branded as The Light) is the third-oldest radio station in the Bahamas, having begun broadcasting in 1973 as the "Northern Service", before adopting its current . It is under ownership of the Broadcasting Corporation of The Bahamas.

The Bahamas' ITU prefix is officially C6-, though it still uses its older ZN- prefix for most of its AM/FM radio and television stations from when it was a United Kingdom colony, though has listed ZNS-3's call sign as C6B-3 in the past, similar to its other non-broadcast signals.

External links
 Broadcasting Corporation of The Bahamas

Radio stations in the Bahamas
Contemporary Christian radio stations
Clear-channel radio stations
Radio stations established in 1973
1973 establishments in the Bahamas
Freeport, Bahamas
Christianity in the Bahamas